Abandoned is a 1955 Italian film set during the aftermath of the Allied invasion of Italy in 1943 during World War II. The film entered the 1955 Venice Film Festival, where it received a special mention.  It is the directorial debut of  Francesco Maselli. The music was composed by Giovanni Fusco and arranged by Ennio Morricone.

In 2008 the film was selected to enter the list of the 100 Italian films to be saved.

Plot
In the summer of 1943, Countess Luisa and her son Andrea left Milan to escape the Allied bombings of the city and retired to their country villa, where they hosted two of Andrea's peers, his cousin Carlo, the son of a Fascist official who fled to Switzerland, and the friend Ferruccio, son of a Royal Army officer engaged in the war. The three young people pass the time in the dolce far niente, sunbathing along the river, only vaguely aware of the ongoing conflict, thanks to the broadcasts of BBC Radio. They begin to become aware of the seriousness of the situation when displaced people arrive from the city and Andrea, out of weakness and not out of solidarity, is forced to accept to host some in the villa, to the annoyance of his mother.

Among the displaced there is the young worker Lucia, whom Andrea falls in love with and thanks to whom he finally comes out of his golden world to face the tragic reality that surrounds them and take responsibility. In the absence of his mother, to whom he is linked by a morbid relationship and towards whom he is in complete awe, he seems to mature and, when Italian soldiers arrive in the village, escaped from a German convoy that was taking them to the labor camps, he finds the courage to hide them in the villa, supported by Carlo and Lucia. But Ferruccio tells what is happening to the old fascist authorities of the country, who inform the Germans.

Having discovered the boy's denunciation, the runaway soldiers flee by truck towards the mountains to join the partisans. Lucia, Carlo and Andrea should go with them, but the arrival of the countess, accompanied by a German officer, extinguishes all the initiative of the last, who agrees to stay with her and abandon her companions to their fate. As he drives away, safe, Andrea sees the German soldiers searching the villa and then when he hears gunshots he realizes, with desperation, that Lucia has been killed.

Cast
Lucia Bosé - Lucia
Isa Miranda - Contessa Luisa
Jean-Pierre Mocky - Andrea
Goliarda Sapienza - Lucia's aunt
Antonio De Teffè - Carlo
 - Ferruccio
Marco Guglielmi - Scattered soldiers' officer
Giuliano Montaldo - Scattered soldier from Tuscany
Ivy Nicholson - Andrea's girlfriend
Fernando Birri - Scattered soldiers' lieutenant
 - Scattered soldier from Veneto
Giulio Paradisi

Mario Girotti
Manfred Freidbager
Bianca Maria Ferrari
Dori Ghezzi

References

External links

Italian war drama films
1955 films
Italian Campaign of World War II films
Films directed by Francesco Maselli
Films scored by Giovanni Fusco
1950s war drama films
Italian black-and-white films
1950s Italian films